Zagotovka is a rural locality (a settlement) in Gremyachinsky Urban okrug, Perm Krai, Russia. The population was 2 as of 2010.

Geography 
Zagotovka is located 16 km southwest of Gremyachinsk (the district's administrative centre) by road. Yugo-Zapadny is the nearest rural locality.

References 

Rural localities in Perm Krai